
Xalapa or Jalapa may refer to any of the following locations:

Guatemala
 Jalapa Department
 Jalapa, Jalapa

Mexico
 Jalapa, Baja California
 Jalapa, Guerrero
 Jalapa Municipality, Tabasco
 Jalapa, Tabasco
 Xalapa, Veracruz
 In the state of Oaxaca:
 Santa María Jalapa del Marqués
 San Felipe Jalapa de Díaz
 Jalapa del Valle

Nepal
Jalapa, Nepal

Nicaragua
 Jalapa, Nueva Segovia

United States
 Jalapa, Indiana
 Jalapa, South Carolina
 Jalapa, Tennessee
 Xalapa Farm, American thoroughbred horse breeding stable in Paris, Kentucky

See also
 Jalap